Nightcruising is an album by the Memphis, Tennessee-based band The Bar-Kays, released on Mercury Records in November 1981. The album reached number six on the Billboard R&B albums chart. The band embraced a more up to date sound with keyboards and synthesizers with this album, and it was much better received by fans than their previous release. Nightcruising is considered one of the Bar-Kays' best albums, and was their third to be certified Gold for sales of over 500,000 copies.

Track listing
All tracks composed by The Bar-Kays and Allen Jones; except where indicated
"Nightcruising"   	 4:18   	
"Hit and Run" 	5:51 	
"Feels Like I'm Falling In Love" 	3:50 	
"Freaky Behavior" (Allen Jones, Howard Redmond, Jr.)	5:10 	
"Touch Tone" 	4:15 	
"Unforgettable Dream" 	4:35 	
"Traffic Jammer" 	5:50 	
"Backseat Driver" 	3:54

Charts

Singles

References

External links
 The Bar-Kays-Nightcruising at Discogs

1981 albums
Bar-Kays albums
Mercury Records albums